Tao Hua (born December 12, 1972 in Shanghai) is a female Chinese softball player who competed in the 1996 Summer Olympics, in the 2000 Summer Olympics, and in the 2004 Summer Olympics.

In 1996 she won the silver medal as part of the Chinese team. She played all ten matches as infielder.

In the 2000 Olympic softball competition she finished fourth with the Chinese team. She played all eight matches as infielder.

Four years later she finished fourth again with the Chinese team in the 2004 Olympic softball tournament. She played all eight matches as infielder again.

External links
profile

1972 births
Living people
Chinese softball players
Olympic silver medalists for China
Olympic softball players of China
Sportspeople from Shanghai
Softball players at the 1996 Summer Olympics
Softball players at the 2000 Summer Olympics
Softball players at the 2004 Summer Olympics
Olympic medalists in softball
Medalists at the 1996 Summer Olympics
Asian Games medalists in softball
Softball players at the 1994 Asian Games
Softball players at the 1998 Asian Games
Softball players at the 2002 Asian Games
Medalists at the 1994 Asian Games
Medalists at the 1998 Asian Games
Medalists at the 2002 Asian Games
Asian Games gold medalists for China
Asian Games silver medalists for China